Orhaniye (literally "land of Orhan" in Turkish) may refer to the following places in Turkey:

 Orhaniye, Bandırma, a village
 Orhaniye, Edirne
 Orhaniye, Karacabey
 Orhaniye, Kazan, a village and neighborhood in the district of Kazan, Ankara Province
 Orhaniye, Keşan
 Orhaniye, Kestel
 Orhaniye, Koçarlı, a village in the district of Koçarlı, Aydın Province
 Orhaniye, Mudanya
 Orhaniye, Mustafakemalpaşa
 Orhaniye, Osmaneli, a village in the district of Osmaneli, Bilecik Province
 Orhaniye, Çay, a village in the district of Çay, Afyonkarahisar Province